Đorđe Lazović may refer to:
Đorđe Lazović (footballer, born 1990), Serbian association football defender
Đorđe Lazović (footballer, born 1992), Serbian association football goalkeeper
Đorđe Lazović (footballer, born 1998), Serbian association football defender, playing for FK Jedinstvo Putevi